Carol Owens (born August 8, 1931) is a Wisconsin legislator and dairy farmer.

Born in Wabeno, Wisconsin, Owens and her husband owned and operated a dairy farm. In 1992, Owens was elected to the Wisconsin State Assembly. Owens served in the Wisconsin State Assembly from 1993 until her retirement in 2009.

Notes

People from Forest County, Wisconsin
Members of the Wisconsin State Assembly
Women state legislators in Wisconsin
1931 births
Living people
21st-century American politicians
21st-century American women politicians